Üstün Bilgi (born 30 May 1988) is a Turkish footballer who plays as a forward for Serik Belediyespor.

References

External links
 
 goal.com

1988 births
Sportspeople from Bursa
Living people
Turkish footballers
Association football forwards
Bursaspor footballers
Kayseri Erciyesspor footballers
Denizlispor footballers
Altınordu F.K. players
Bandırmaspor footballers
Fethiyespor footballers
Bayrampaşaspor footballers
Süper Lig players
TFF First League players
TFF Second League players
TFF Third League players